Garhi Sampla-Kiloi Assembly constituency is one of the 90 assembly constituencies of Haryana a northern state of India. It is also part of Rohtak Lok Sabha constituency.

List of Members of Legislative Assembly

Assembly elections 2019

References
 
1.https://www.firstpost.com/politics/garhi-sampla-kiloi-election-2019-haryana-assembly-election-vidhan-sabha-seat-chunav-candidates-name-mla-votl/amp#aoh=15709444827498&referrer=https%3A%2F%2Fwww.google.com&amp_tf=From%20%251%24s

Assembly constituencies of Haryana